(born 1976) is a Japanese media artist, programmer, engineer, and DJ who creates artwork and interactive installations that utilize contemporary technologies such as virtual reality as well as prominent use of light and sound. He founded Rhizomatiks in 2006 after graduating from the University of Tokyo. His work with Rhizomatics includes collaborations with Perfume, Björk, Nike, and Honda, and an augmented reality computer graphics display at the closing ceremony of the 2016 Summer Olympics in Rio de Janeiro, Brazil.

References

External links
 Official website

21st-century Japanese artists
21st-century Japanese engineers
Japanese computer programmers

1976 births
Living people